Macedonian Footballer of the Year an annual title awarded to the best football player of the year in North Macedonia.

Men's
Best player (domestic)
2004: Aleksandar Vasoski
2006: Artim Položani
2011: Ferhan Hasani
2013: Dejan Blaževski
2014: Borce Manevski
2015: Filip Gachevski
2016: Besart Ibraimi
2017: Stefan Spirovski
2018: Besart Ibraimi
2019: Visar Musliu

Best player (in foreign league)
2004: Goran Pandev
2006: Goran Pandev
2007: Goran Pandev
2008: Goran Pandev
2010: Goran Pandev
2011: Ivan Tričkovski
2012: Agim Ibraimi
2013: Nikolče Noveski
2014: Agim Ibraimi
2015: Aleksandar Trajkovski
2016: Ilija Nestorovski
2017: Enis Bardhi
2018: Enis Bardhi
2019: Elif Elmas

Best foreign player
2004:  Gilson Da Silva
2006:  Ivan Pejčić
2011:  Milan Đurić

Best goalscorer
2010: Mile Krstev
2011: Blaže Ilioski
2013: Jovan Kostovski

Coach of the year
2004: Gjore Jovanovski
2010: Vlatko Kostov
2011: 
2013: Blagoja Milevski

Young player of the year
2004: Goran Tričkovski
2010: Stefan Ristovski
2011: Darko Velkovski
2013: Marjan Radeski

Best club in youth category
2010: FK Rabotnički
2011: KF Renova
2013: FK Metalurg Skopje

Team of the year
2006: FK Rabotnički
2010: KF Renova
2011: KF Shkëndija

Fair Play award
2004: FK Sileks
2010: FK Rabotnički
2011: FK Sileks
2013: FK Rabotnički

Women
Best player
2004: Sirieta Brahimi
2006: Milka Arsova
2010: Nataša Andonova
2011: Gentjana Rochi
2013: Nataša Andonova

Best goalscorer
2013: Eli Jakovska (as Elena)

Coach of the year
2013: Astrit Merko

Team of the year
2006: ŽFK Skiponjat
2006: ŽFK Fighter
2011: ŽFK Naše Taksi

Futsal
Best player
2006: Zoran Leveski
2010: Zoran Leveski
2011: Zoran Leveski
2013: Dragan Petrović

Coach of the year
2013: Zoran Lekić
2014: Zoran Leveski

Team of the Year
2006: 
2010:  Skopje
2011: KMF Zelezarec Skopje

Other
Best referee
2010: Aleksandar Stavrev
2011: Aleksandar Stavrev
2013: 

Special recognition for referee
2011: Ljubomir Krstevski

Best football worker
2011: Blagoje Istatov
2013: Dragan Popovski, president of FK Rabotnički

Special recognition for football contribution
2011: Miodrag Micković for 50 years of sports journalism
2010: Dobrislav Dimovski
2013: Andon Dončevski (First coach of the North Macedonia national football team)

References
UEFA.com
UEFA.com
MacedonianFootball.com
MacedonianFootball.com
UEFA.com

Football in North Macedonia
Association football player of the year awards by nationality
Awards established in 2004
2004 establishments in the Republic of Macedonia
Macedonian awards
Annual events in North Macedonia